Diictodon is an extinct genus of pylaecephalid   dicynodont. These mammal-like synapsids lived during the Late Permian period, approximately 255 million years ago. Fossils have been found in the Cistecephalus Assemblage Zone of the Madumabisa Mudstone of the Luangwa Basin in Zambia and the Tropidostoma Assemblage Zone of the Teekloof Formation, Tapinocephalus Assemblage Zone of the Abrahamskraal Formation, Dicynodon Assemblage Zone of the Balfour Formation, Cistecephalus Assemblage Zone of the Middleton or Balfour Formation of South Africa and the Guodikeng Formation of China. Roughly half of all Permian vertebrate specimens found in South Africa are those of Diictodon. This small herbivorous animal was one of the most successful synapsids in the Permian period.

Characteristics

Appearance 

Diictodon had disproportionally large heads that ended in a horny beak. Both males and females had a pair of tusks sticking out from the upper jaw, with those of the male being slightly larger. Diictodon had strong arms and legs, as well as 5 sharp claws on each hand, and may have had keen senses of smell and sight. Their gait was similar to the 'high walk' of crocodiles. Their jaws were also simplified, with some of the bones dedicated instead to hearing, considered a key sign of mammalian adaptation. Diictodon also had many adaptations for digging, such as highly developed muscles, a cylindrical body, and wide hands. Researchers Chinsmay and Rubridge analyzed seven other  Dicynodonts species discovering  the humerual bone microstructure in Diictidon showed no signs of growth marks indicating a variation in its growth strategy that further improved their ability to dig.

Lifestyle 
 
As a therapsid, Diictodon shared many features with modern-day mammals. Still, many scientists believe that Diictodon lived like the modern gopher. Their burrows could have been used to escape the heat of the desert, which was the dominant environment on the continent of Pangaea in the Late Permian Period. Inside these burrows, nests have been found, where Diictodon skeletons are present. They constituted of quite a gregarious lifestyle with numerous burrows in 500 square meters of space. However, their burrows were unconnected and did not form any large colonies. Many Diictodon nested close to flood plains, and some specimens may have been killed as water flowed into the nests, drowning the animals. Diictidon’s  primary utilization of humeral excursion rather than forearm extension aided in employing rotation thrusting when burrowing. Diictodon had no known rival species competing in its niche, so they may have competed primarily with others of their species for the little plant material available. Fossils of infant Diictodon discovered in brood chambers in some burrows suggest there was parental care in the genus, and that males seem to have been involved in raising the infants, based on the fact that some adults in said burrows had tusks.

Diet 
Like all dicynodonts, Diictodon were herbivorous. They used their beaks to break off pieces of the sparse desert shrubs. Like modern desert animals, Diictodon may have had unusually efficient digestive systems, due to the lack of nutrients present in desert plants. As burrowing animals, they may have fed off of water-rich plant tubers.

Sexual Dimorphism 
Previously, tusked individuals were considered males, while tuskless individuals were considered females. Differences in pelvic structure may be the other evidence for sexual dimorphism.

References

Further reading 
 

Dicynodonts
Wuchiapingian genus first appearances
Wuchiapingian genus extinctions
Lopingian synapsids of Africa
Permian South Africa
Fossils of South Africa
Beaufort Group
Fossils of Zambia
Lopingian synapsids of Asia
Permian China
Fossils of China
Fossil taxa described in 1913
Anomodont genera